The 1950 All-Big Ten Conference football team consists of American football players chosen by various organizations for All-Big Ten Conference teams for the 1950 Big Nine Conference football season. The selectors for the 1950 season were the Associated Press (AP), based on a vote of the conference coaches, and the United Press (UP). Players selected as first-team players by both the AP and UP are designated in bold.

Michigan captured the Big Ten championship, was ranked #9 in the final AP Poll, defeated California in the 1951 Rose Bowl, and placed three of its player on one or both of the first teams. Michigan's honorees were halfback Chuck Ortmann, fullback Don Dufek, and tackle Robert Wahl.

Illinois compiled a 7–2 record and a #13 ranking in the final AP Poll and had four players selected as first-team honorees. The Illinois first-team honorees were halfback Dick Raklovits, end Tony Klimek, center Bill Vohaska and guard Chuck Brown.

Ohio State compiled a 6–3 record and a #14 ranking in the final AP Poll and placed four players on the first team. The Ohio State first-team honorees were quarterback and 1950 Heisman Trophy winner Vic Janowicz, tackle Bill Trautwein, and guard John Biltz

All Big-Ten selections

Quarterbacks
 Vic Janowicz, Ohio State (AP-1; UP-1)
 Tony Curcillo, Ohio State (AP-2)
 Dick Flowers, Northwestern (UP-2)

Halfbacks
 Chuck Ortmann, Michigan (AP-1; UP-1)
 Dick Raklovits, Illinois (AP-1; UP-1)
 Johnny Karras, Illinois (AP-2; UP-2)
 Walt Klevay, Ohio State (AP-2; UP-2)

Fullbacks
 Don Dufek, Sr., Michigan (AP-1; UP-2)
 Bill Reichardt, Iowa (AP-2; UP-1)

Ends
 Tony Klimek, Illinois (AP-1; UP-1)
 Don Stonesifer, Northwestern (AP-1; UP-1)
 Leo Sugar, Purdue (AP-2; UP-2)
 Thomas G. Watson, Ohio State (AP-2)
 Clifton Anderson, Indiana (UP-2)

Tackles
 Bill Trautwein, Ohio State (AP-1; UP-1)
 Robert Wahl, Michigan (AP-1; UP-1)
 Ken Huxhold, Wisconsin (AP-2; UP-2)
 Al Tate, Illinois (AP-2; UP-2)

Guards
 Charles E. "Chuck" Brown, Illinois (AP-1; UP-1)
 John Biltz, Ohio State (AP-1; UP-1)
 Lynn Lynch, Illinois (AP-2; UP-2)
 John Simcic, Wisconsin (AP-2; UP-2)

Centers
 Bill Vohaska, Illinois (AP-1; UP-1)
 Tony Momsen, Michigan (AP-2; UP-2)

Key
AP = Associated Press, chosen by conference coaches

UP = United Press

Bold = Consensus first-team selection of both the AP and UP

See also
1950 College Football All-America Team

References

All-Big Ten Conference
All-Big Ten Conference football teams